Sixty Lights is a 2004 novel by Australian author Gail Jones.

Themes

The novel explores the themes of the family relationships, marriage, death and loss.

Dedication
"For my brothers, Peter and Kevin Jones."

Awards
Booker Prize, 2004: longlisted 
Western Australian Premier's Book Awards, Fiction, 2004: winner 
Western Australian Premier's Book Awards, Premier's Prize, 2004: winner 
Commonwealth Writers Prize, South East Asia and South Pacific Region, Best Book, 2005: commended 
Miles Franklin Literary Award, 2005: shortlisted 
New South Wales Premier's Literary Awards, Christina Stead Prize for Fiction, 2005: shortlisted 
Australian Literature Society Gold Medal, 2005
The Age Book of the Year Award, Fiction Prize, 2005: winner 
Victorian Premier's Literary Award, The Vance Palmer Prize for Fiction, 2005: shortlisted 
South Australia Premier's Awards Fiction, 2006: winner 
South Australia Premier's Awards Best Overall Published Work, 2006: winner 
International Dublin Literary Award, 2006: longlisted

Notes
 This novel was translated for Dutch, Polish, Portuguese, Spanish and German editions.

Reviews
"The Age" 
"The Asian Review of Books" 
"Australian Book Review" 
"The Guardian" 
"The Telegraph" 

2004 Australian novels
ALS Gold Medal winning works
Novels by Gail Jones
Modernist novels
Nonlinear narrative novels